TVP3 Warszawa (TVP3 Warsaw) is one of the regional branches of the TVP, Poland's public television broadcaster. It serves the entire Masovian Voivodeship with particular dedication to the Warsaw metropolitan area. From 1992 till 2003 it was branded WOT (Warszawski Ośrodek Telewizyjny, Warsaw Television Centre), then till 2007 TVP3 Warszawa and since October 2007 it has been using its current name.

Since the reorganisation of TVP's regional broadcasting in 2013, TVP3 Warszawa has been part of TVP Regionalna, a network of TVP's 16 regional branches. It has its own digital, free-to-air channel branded TVP3 Warszawa, but it produces only several hours of programming a day and the rest of the schedule is filled with network programming.

The main studios are located at the TVP news compound in central Warsaw and local bureaus are in Płock, Radom and Siedlce.

Programs
Some of the best known TVP Warszawa's programmes include:
Telewizyjny Kurier Warszawski (Warsaw Television Chronicle) - local news from the Warsaw area (the oldest news program in Poland)
Telewizyjny Kronika Mazowiecki (Mazovia Television Chronicle) - regional news from the voivodeship
Kronika Warszawy i Mazowsza (Warsaw & Masovia Chronicle) - combined news from Warsaw and the voivodeship
Raport na gorąco (Hot Report or translating less literally First Hand Report) - news from traffic accidents etc. gathered by reporters on motorbikes
Wywiad Kronika (The Chronicle's Interview) - local interview show, often with local political topics
Ratownicy (The Rescuers) - reports from the work of Warsaw's emergency services

References

External links 
 

Telewizja Polska
Television channels and stations established in 1958
1958 establishments in Poland
Mass media in Warsaw